Steven Ryland Hathaway (born September 13, 1990) is an American former professional baseball pitcher who played in Major League Baseball (MLB) for the Arizona Diamondbacks in 2016.

Amateur career
Hathaway attended Acton-Boxborough Regional High School in Acton, Massachusetts, and Franklin Pierce University. In 2011, he briefly played collegiate summer baseball in the Cape Cod Baseball League for the Yarmouth-Dennis Red Sox. After his junior year at Franklin Pierce, the Diamondbacks selected Hathaway in the 14th round of the 2013 MLB draft.

Professional career
The Diamondbacks promoted Hathaway to the Major Leagues on July 30, 2016. He posted a 4.91 ERA in 14.2 innings over 24 games for the Diamondbacks in 2016. He was outrighted to AAA on October 16, 2017, and released by the organization on March 14, 2019.

, Hathaway had the most career Major League pitching appearances without a game started or a game finished.

References

External links

1990 births
Living people
Sportspeople from Cambridge, Massachusetts
Baseball players from Massachusetts
Major League Baseball pitchers
Arizona Diamondbacks players
Franklin Pierce Ravens baseball players
Yarmouth–Dennis Red Sox players
Missoula Osprey players
South Bend Silver Hawks players
Kane County Cougars players
Visalia Rawhide players
Mobile BayBears players
Reno Aces players
Sportspeople from Middlesex County, Massachusetts
People from Acton, Massachusetts
Jackson Generals (Southern League) players